This is the list of the number-one albums of the UK Album Downloads Chart during the 2020s.

Number-one albums

By artist

, Four artists have spent three or more weeks at the top of the UK Official Download Chart so far during the 2020s. The totals below do not include compilation albums credited to various artists.

By record label
, Fifty six record labels have released a chart-topping album so far during the 2020s.The totals below do not include compilation albums credited to various artists apart from soundtracks which are included.

See also
List of UK Compilation Chart number ones of the 2020s

References

External links
Album Download Chart Archive at the Official Charts Company

2020s in British music
United Kingdom Albums Downloads
Download